Charles Ellis Moore (January 3, 1884 – April 2, 1941) was an American lawyer and politician who served as a U.S. Representative from Ohio from 1919 to 1933.

Biography 
Born near Middlebourne, Ohio, Moore attended the common schools and Mount Union College, Alliance, Ohio. He taught school in Oxford Township, Ohio. He then graduated from Muskingum College, New Concord, Ohio, in 1907 and from the College of Law at Ohio State University, Columbus, Ohio, in 1910. He was admitted to the bar in 1910.

Moore began his career as an attorney in Cambridge, Ohio. He also served as prosecuting attorney of Guernsey County (1914–1918).

Moore was elected as a Republican to the Sixty-sixth and to the six succeeding Congresses (March 4, 1919 – March 3, 1933). He was one of the House managers appointed by the House of Representatives in 1926 to conduct the impeachment trial proceedings against George W. English, judge of the United States District Court for the Eastern District of Illinois.

He was an unsuccessful candidate for reelection in 1932 to the Seventy-third Congress. He resumed the practice of law in Cambridge, Ohio. He also engaged in the banking business.

Moore died in Cambridge on April 2, 1941. He was interred in Northwood Cemetery.

Sources

1884 births
1941 deaths
University of Mount Union alumni
Muskingum University alumni
Ohio State University Moritz College of Law alumni
People from Cambridge, Ohio
County district attorneys in Ohio
Ohio lawyers
20th-century American politicians
People from Guernsey County, Ohio
20th-century American lawyers
Republican Party members of the United States House of Representatives from Ohio